James Martin Underdahl (February 4, 1894 – October 7, 1968) was a provincial politician from Alberta, Canada. He served as a member of the Legislative Assembly of Alberta from 1948 to 1955, sitting with the Social Credit caucus in government.

References

Alberta Social Credit Party MLAs
1968 deaths
1894 births
American emigrants to Canada